The 1986 Embassy World Indoor Bowls Championship was held at the Coatbridge indoor bowling club, North Lanarkshire, Scotland, from 03-9 February 1986.Tony Allcock won the title beating Phil Skoglund in the final.

The inaugural 1986 Midland Bank World Indoor Pairs Championship was held at the Bournemouth International Centre from 7–13 April 1986.
David Bryant & Tony Allcock won the title beating Bob Fairbairn & Bob Stephenson in the final 5 sets to 2 (5-6, 8-3, 8-3, 10-1, 1-9, 8-5, 8-3).

Winners

Draw and results

Men's singles

Men's Pairs

Group stages

Medal round

References

External links
Official website

World Indoor Bowls Championship
1986 in bowls